Loren Horsley (born 1977) is a New Zealand-born actress and writer. She played Lily in the 2007 film Eagle vs Shark, which she co-wrote with her then-partner, Taika Waititi.

Charity work 
Horsley does voiceovers, casting, and acting in the promotional videos for the One Percent Collective run by Pat Shepherd. The One Percent Collective supports small New Zealand charities, including  Kaibosh and Amped4life. Kaibosh is a Wellington-based charity that collects surplus food from retailers and redistributes it amongst local charities, who then give the food to people in need. Amped4Life works directly with schools, industry and the community to tackle the underlying causes of drug and alcohol abuse.

Awards and nominations
 2003 New Zealand Film and TV Awards - nominated for Best Screenplay with Grant Lahood, Jason Whyte, Gentiane Lupi, and Genevieve McClean for Kombi Nation
 2007 Newport International Film Festival (United States) - Jury award for Best Actress - Eagle vs Shark

Plays and films
Existence (2012)
Dancing in the Sky (2011) 
Diagnosis: Death (2009) 
The Handover (2008)
Eagle vs Shark (2007) – Lily
Lovely Rita (2007)
Bad Dates (2005)
Heinous Crime (2004) – Lawyer, Jury member, Debbie
The Insiders Guide to Happiness (2004) (TV) – Olive
Kombi Nation (2003) – Liz
The Strip (2002-2003)
Atlantis High (2001) (TV) – Sabrina Georgia
Xena: Warrior Princess (2000) (TV) – Sieglinda
Young Hercules (1998) (TV) – Cleo

References

External links

Interview with Loren Horsley and Taika Waititi
Interview with Taika Waititi and Loren Horsley

New Zealand film actresses
New Zealand television actresses
Living people
1977 births